This is a list of military actions which led to one or more of the combatants being awarded a Victoria Cross.

 1898 Occupation of Crete
 Battle of Abu Klea
 Action of Elouges
 Andaman Islands Expedition
 Battle of Balaclava
 Battle of Arnhem
 Battle of Elandslaagte
 Battle of Guillemont
 Battle of Hill 70
 Battle of Hlobane
 Battle of Intombe
 Battle of Jutland
 Battle of Khaz Oruzgan
 Battle of Khushab
 Battle of Laing's Nek
 Battle of Morval
 Battle of Neuve Chapelle
 Battle of Peiwar Kotal
 Battle of Rorke's Drift
 Battle of the Ancre Heights
 Battle of the Canal du Nord
 Battle of the Imjin River
 Battle of the Scarpe (1918)
 Battle of Bau
 Battle of Bergendal
 Channel Dash
 Chitral Expedition
 Battle of Colenso
 Battle of Crete
 Operation Crusader
 Siege of Delhi
 Battle of Delville Wood
 Dieppe Raid
 First Battle of El Alamein
 First Mohmand Campaign
 Battle of Gazala
 Gold Beach
 Battle of Goose Green
 Battle of Hill 170
 Battle of Imphal
 Battle of Inkerman
 Battle of Isandlwana
 Battle of Kohima
 Relief of Ladysmith
 Battle of Le Cateau
 Battle of Leliefontein
 Siege of Lucknow
 Battle of Magdala
 Battle of Magersfontein
 Battle of Maiwand
 Manipur Expedition
 Battle of Mount Longdon
 Namsos Campaign
 Battles of Narvik
 Action at Néry
 Battle of Omdurman
 Operation Chastise
 Operation Struggle
 Second Ostend Raid
 Battle of Paardeberg
 Perak War
 Battle of Ratsua
 Samarrah Offensive
 Battle of Sattelberg
 Second Battle of Heligoland Bight
 Shah Wali Kot Offensive
 Operation Shingle
 Siege of Mafeking
 Siege of Malakand
 Siege of Sevastopol (1854–1855)
 Operation Source
 St Nazaire Raid
 Battle of Tamai
 Battle of Tel el-Kebir
 Battle of the Tugela Heights
 Umbeyla Campaign
 War of the Golden Stool
 Zeebrugge Raid

Victoria Cross lists